Poirot's Early Cases is a short story collection written by Agatha Christie and first published in the UK by Collins Crime Club in September 1974. The book retailed at £2.25. Although the stories contained within the volume had all appeared in previous US collections, the book also appeared there later in 1974 under the slightly different title of Hercule Poirot's Early Cases in an edition retailing at $6.95.

In the collection, Christie charts some of the cases from Hercule Poirot's early career, before he was internationally renowned as a detective. All the stories had first been published in periodicals between 1923 and 1935.

Plot summaries

"The Affair at the Victory Ball"
Chief Inspector Japp asks Poirot to assist Scotland Yard in the strange events which took place at a recent costumed Victory Ball. A group of six people, headed by the young Viscount Cronshaw, attended dressed in the costume of the Commedia dell'arte. Lord Cronshaw was Harlequin, his uncle, the honourable Eustace Beltane, was Punchinello and Mrs Mallaby, an American widow, was Punchinella. In the roles of Pierrot and Pierrette were Mr and Mrs Christopher Davidson (he being a stage actor) and finally, Miss "Coco" Courtenay, an actress rumoured to be engaged to Lord Cronshaw, was Columbine. 

The night went badly from the start when it was obvious to the party that Cronshaw and Miss Courtenay were not on speaking terms. The latter was crying and asked Chris Davidson to take her home to her flat in Chelsea. When they had gone, a friend of Cronshaw's spotted Harlequin in a box looking down on the ball and called up to him to join them on the main floor. Cronshaw left the box to join them but then disappeared. He was found ten minutes later on the floor of the supper room, stabbed through the heart with a table knife, his body strangely stiff. Coco Courtenay is found dead in her bed from an overdose of cocaine; at the inquest that followed, it was found that she was addicted to the drug. Poirot starts to investigate, finding out to everyone's puzzlement that Cronshaw was emphatically opposed to drugs, that Beltane's costume had a hump and a ruffle and that a curtained recess exists in the supper room. He arranges a get-together of the people involved at his flat where he puts on a shadowed presentation across a back-lit screen of the six costumes but then reveals that there were actually five. Underneath Pierrot's loose garb is that of the slimmer-fitting Harlequin. Davidson leaps forward and curses Poirot but is quickly arrested by Japp.

Poirot reveals that the strength with which the knife was plunged into Cronshaw meant that a man was responsible for the crime. The stiffness of the body meant he had been dead for some time and not killed in the ten-minute interval between being seen in the box and then being found dead on the floor, therefore the figure seen as Harlequin was one of the others. It could not have been Beltane as his costume was too elaborate to change quickly. Davidson killed Cronshaw earlier, hid the body in the curtained recess, then took Courtenay home where he fed her an overdose of the drug. He did not stay there as he claimed but returned immediately. His motive was self-preservation as it was he who had been supplying Courtenay with drugs and Cronshaw was on the point of finding out and exposing him.

"The Adventure of the Clapham Cook"

Poirot is not interested in investigating some of the cases which appear in the newspapers and which Hastings tries to bring to his attention. These include a bank clerk (Mr Davis) who disappears with fifty thousand pounds of securities, a suicidal man and a missing typist. He is put on the spot though when visited by a Mrs Todd who is determined that he investigate her missing cook. Challenged, he decides, with some humour and to avoid an argument, to take the seemingly trivial case. Eliza Dunn, a middle-aged woman, walked out of her job and the Todds' house in Clapham two days ago without working her notice and has not communicated with her employer since, except for sending for her trunk that day.

Interviewing the maid in the house, Poirot finds out that the trunk was already packed, meaning that Eliza had planned to leave even though her departure was swift. The other occupants of the house are Mr Todd, who works in the City, and their lodger, Mr Simpson, who works in the same bank at which Mr Davis worked. Struck by this coincidence as he is, Poirot cannot see a connection between an absconding bank clerk and a missing cook. Poirot places advertisements in the newspaper enquiring as to the whereabouts of Eliza and several days later he is successful in locating her when she visits Poirot's rooms. She tells him a story of having come into a legacy of a house in Carlisle and an income of three hundred pounds a year, dependent upon her taking up the offer and immediately leaving domestic service. This legacy was communicated to her by a man who approached her in the street as she was returning to the Todds' house one night, the man supposedly having come from there to see her. The money came from a friend of her late grandmother who had settled in Australia and married a wealthy settler. Eliza had immediately taken the train north and a couple of days later received her belongings from Clapham, although wrapped in paper parcels and not in her old trunk, which she supposes had been kept behind by Mrs Todd in a fit of pique.

Poirot rushes back to Clapham with Hastings and explains matters on the way. Simpson stole the securities himself and killed Davis. Davis would be the suspect when he did not return from lunch on the day that the theft was discovered. Simpson needed an old, inconspicuous trunk in which to hide the body and that meant diverting Eliza out of the way. It was Simpson in disguise who had approached her in the street. On arriving at Clapham, Simpson has already disappeared but is traced to an ocean liner bound for the US. The trunk with Davis' body inside is located at a Glasgow railway station. Poirot views the link between a disappearing cook and a murder to be one of his most interesting cases, and he frames the cheque sent by Mr Todd for his consulting fee as a reminder of it.

"The Cornish Mystery"
Poirot receives a visit from a Mrs Pengelley, a middle-aged woman who is afraid that she is being poisoned by her husband, a dentist. She has been ill after eating but her doctor states that she is suffering from acute gastritis. She and her husband live in Polgarwith, a small market town in Cornwall. She has no proof of the allegation, only that she only suffers when her husband is at home, not when he is away at the weekends, and a bottle of weedkiller, supposedly unused, is half-empty. There could be no financial motive to suggest why Mr Pengelley should try to murder his wife but she suspects an affair with his young receptionist. Another resident in the house was her niece, Freda Stanton, but that lady had a row with Mrs Pengelley the week before and left the house after living there for eight years. Mrs Pengelley is vague as to the cause of the row but states that she has been told by a Mr Radnor to leave Freda to come to her senses. Radnor is described as "just a friend" and a "very pleasant young fellow".

Poirot and Hastings travel to Cornwall the next day and are shocked to find that Mrs Pengelley died half an hour before. Poirot interviews the dead woman's doctor, who at first denies that anything could be wrong but is then astounded to learn she had gone to London to consult the detective. Their last visit before leaving Cornwall is to Mrs Pengelley's niece. They meet Freda Stanton and Jacob Radnor and discover that the couple is engaged, and that the cause of the row between Freda and her aunt was the older woman's own infatuation with Radnor, a far younger man. The situation became so bad that Freda had no option but to move out.

Poirot and Hastings return to London but are able to follow events in the papers as rumour spreads leading to Mrs Pengelley's body being exhumed and traces of arsenic found. Her widower is arrested and charged with murder. Attending the committal hearing, Poirot invites Radnor back to his flat where he produces a written confession for the man to sign. He planned to get rid of both the Pengelleys, one through murder and the other by execution so his new wife, Freda, would inherit their money. Mrs Pengelley fell for Radnor because he made sure she would, flirting with her while at the same time planting seeds in the woman's mind that her husband was trying to poison her. Poirot offers him twenty-four hours escape if he signs the confession before he hands it over to the police and dupes the man into thinking that Poirot's own flat is being watched. Radnor signs and hurries out. Poirot confesses to Hastings that he did not have any real evidence of Radnor's guilt and that the stunt was his only option to get Mr Pengelley acquitted. He is sure that Scotland Yard will catch up with Radnor, despite the latter's twenty-four hours head start.

"The Adventure of Johnnie Waverly"
Poirot is called in to investigate the kidnapping of three-year-old Johnnie Waverly, the son of Marcus Waverly, from his home, Waverly Court in Surrey. Prior to the kidnapping, the family received anonymous letters that threatened to take the boy unless twenty-five thousand pounds was paid. The police took little interest until the final letter which stated that the boy would be kidnapped at twelve o'clock the next day. On that day, Mrs Waverly was mildly poisoned and a note was left on Mr Waverly's pillow that stated, "At Twelve O'clock". Horrified that someone inside the house is involved, Mr Waverly sacks all of the staff except Tredwell, his long-time butler, and Miss Collins, his wife's trusted secretary-companion. 

At the appointed time Waverly, his son and Inspector McNeil of Scotland Yard are in a locked room in the house with police posted in the extensive grounds. Precisely at noon the police find a tramp sneaking toward the house. He has cotton wool, chloroform and a post-kidnap note ready to plant. When Waverly and the Inspector dash outside to see what is happening, the boy is taken by car through a now unguarded gate. They hear the village clock chiming twelve and realise that the main clock in the house had been set forward ten minutes. The tramp claims Tredwell employed him but the butler has an alibi for the time that he was said to meet the tramp: he was in the house with Mr Waverly.

Poirot travels to Waverly Court and is told of the existence of a priest hole. In it he finds the footprint of a small dog in one corner but no one knew of any such creature small enough in the house. After questioning the child's sacked nurse, Tredwell and Miss Collins, Poirot concludes his investigation. Poirot confronts Mr Waverly. Poirot says that Waverly kidnapped his own son to get money from his rich but very parsimonious wife. The poisoning of the wife to incapacitate her, the note on the pillow and the re-setting of the clock all point to an inside job, and only Mr Waverly could sack all of the servants to reduce the level of protection around the child. Tredwell was in on the plan and he did indeed employ the tramp. The footprint of the dog in the priest's hole was from a toy kept there to amuse the boy until he could be spirited away afterwards. A shamefaced Mr Waverly confesses to Poirot and reveals that the child was presently with his former nurse.

"The Double Clue"
Poirot is called in by Marcus Hardman, a collector of various antique precious objects, to investigate a jewel theft. The theft occurred from his safe when he was holding a small tea party at his house. He showed his guests his collection of medieval jewels and later discovered that the safe had been rifled and the objects taken. Four of his guests had the opportunity to take the items – Mr Johnston, a South African millionaire only just arrived in London; Countess Vera Rossakoff, a refugee from the Russian Revolution; Bernard Parker, a young and effeminate agent for Mr Hardman, and Lady Runcorn, a middle-aged society lady whose aunt is a kleptomaniac. 

Poirot examines the scene of the crime and finds a man's glove holding the safe open and a cigarette case with the initials "BP". He visits Bernard Parker who  states that the glove is his – but vehemently denies owning the cigarette case. Nevertheless, Poirot finds the twin of the glove in the hallway of Parker's house. Later that day, Poirot receives a visit from the Countess Rossakoff who is indignant that Poirot is pursuing Parker. Previously suspicious that the Countess may not be a real Russian, Poirot admits that the impressive lady is who she says she is. That evening, Hastings sees Poirot studying a book on Russian grammar. 

The next day, Poirot visits Hardman and tells him who the thief is. The collector is astonished and leaves Poirot to pursue the matter without police involvement. Poirot and Hastings visit the Countess and Poirot calmly tells the lady that his taxi is waiting and that he would be obliged if she would give him the jewels. She, equally calmly, does so. They part on good terms, the Countess admitting that Poirot is one of the few men she fears. He in turn is very impressed by her. He tells Hastings that it was the double clue of the glove and the case which made him suspicious. Only one of the clues was genuine and the other a mistake. As the cigarette case was not Parker's, that must have been the genuine clue. The case belonged to the Countess whose initials – VR – are ВР in Cyrillic, hence Poirot's perusal of the book on Russian grammar.

"The King of Clubs"
The Oglander family was playing bridge in the drawing room of their house in Streatham last night when the French windows burst open and a woman staggered in, blood on her dress. She managed to say, "Murder!" and then collapsed. The family fetched both a doctor and the police who called at the next-door villa to find the body of Henry Reedburn, the theatrical impresario, dead in the library with his skull split open by some unknown weapon. The woman is identified as the famous dancer, Valerie Saintclair.

Poirot receives a visit from Prince Paul of Maurania, who wants to marry the dancer. Reedburn was in love with Valerie although his feelings were not reciprocated. Prince Paul and Valerie saw a clairvoyant the previous week who turned over the king of clubs in her pack of cards and said a man threatened danger to her. The prince is afraid that Valerie interpreted this to mean Reedburn, and attacked him.

Poirot and Hastings visit the scene of the crime. The library runs the length of one side of the house. At either end are curtained recesses with French windows, one to the garden and the other to the drive. It was in the recess facing the garden that Reedburn was found. The dead man had a female visitor that night that he let into the house himself, but the servants did not see her. Poirot sees a marble seat in the recess, whose arm-ends are carved in the form of lions' heads. He wonders if they could have caused the wound to Reedburn's head. The doctor says that there is no blood on the marble.

They proceed to the Oglander home, along the garden path. In the drawing room, the table with the cards for the interrupted bridge game is still in place. Miss Saintclair is still in the house, ill in bed. She tells them that Reedburn held a secret of hers and threatened her but she did not kill him. She went to his house by prior appointment and was pleading with him when a man dressed like a tramp attacked him from behind the curtained recess. She fled from the house towards the lights of the Oglander house. 

Returning to the drawing room Poirot notices that the king of clubs is missing from the cards on the bridge table. They return to Reedburn's house and in the curtained recess that leads to the drive they find a twin of the marble seat, again with lion's head arms but this one has a faint bloodstain on it. Reedburn was killed here and his body dragged to the recess facing the garden. Poirot has the missing king of clubs, having taken it from the card box before at the Oglander house. He returns there to assure Mrs Oglander that the police will not find out what happened. He returns the playing card to her, telling her it was their only slip-up.

He tells Hastings what happened. The bridge game was set up after the event as an alibi for the four members of the family. By mistake one card was left in the box. The son of the family killed Reedburn when he went with Valerie to plead with the blackmailer, presumably when things escalated into violence. Valerie is the estranged daughter of the Oglander family. Despite the breach in the relationship, she turned to them in her moment of need. Her story of the tramp will stand and she is free to marry Prince Paul.

This is one of the few cases (aside from Murder on the Orient Express) in which Poirot allows a guilty party to avoid punishment, particularly when there is a dead body involved.

"The Lemesurier Inheritance"
In the latter days of the First World War, Poirot and Hastings dine at the Carlton where they meet Captain Vincent Lemesurier and his uncle Hugo, a chemist. Cousin Roger rushes in with the news that Vincent's father has had a serious fall from a horse and is not expected to last the night. Vincent and Uncle Hugo leave.

Vincent, the eldest and only of three sons to survive the war, was not close with his father. Roger tells them that Vincent's strong reaction to the bad news is partly due to the Lemesurier curse. No first-born son has lived to inherit the family estate since the Middle Ages. This family curse arose from an ancestor who erroneously suspected his wife of being unfaithful and his young son of not being his own. In a fit of rage he killed them both. His wife cursed him before she died that no first-born son of his descendants should ever inherit. Instead it passed to nephews, younger brothers or younger sons.

The next day, Poirot and Hastings learn that Vincent died, after he jumped from the moving train on the way home. His death is put down to a mental breakdown, from the bad news and shell shock. Over the next few years all of the inheritors of the estate die, under causes as varied as gun accident and insect sting, leaving Hugo, youngest of five brothers, to inherit the family estate.

Poirot receives a visit from Hugo's young wife. She is an American who does not believe in the curse. She worries about the elder of her two young sons, Ronald, who is eight. He has had three narrow escapes from death in the past few months. One was a fall when the boy was climbing down the ivy on the wall of their home. She saw for herself that the stem had been cut. In the house are the family, the children's governess, Hugo's secretary, John Gardiner, and frequent visitor, cousin Major Roger Lemesurier, a favorite with the boys. Poirot and Hastings travel to the home in Northumberland and renew their acquaintance with Hugo. He believes his first-born son is doomed by the curse, while his second son will inherit. Hugo will die soon as he has an incurable disease, news he shares with Poirot and Hastings.

Young Ronald is stung by a bee, by his father's report, and Poirot is immediately concerned. He and Hastings keep vigil all night in Ronald's room. A figure creeps into the darkened bedroom and is about to poison the young boy by injection when Poirot and Hastings overpower him. It is Hugo, the boy's father. He is responsible for the deaths until he gained the estate, and is now a madman. Hugo is placed in an asylum, where he dies. Mrs Lemesurier later marries John Gardiner, and the curse, if it existed, is broken.

"The Lost Mine"
Poirot informs Hastings that he has no risky investments except for fourteen thousand shares in Burma Mines Ltd, which were given to him for services rendered. He relates the story to Hastings. The lead-silver mines were originally worked only for the silver by the Chinese in the fifteenth century. The lead remained, of value now. The mine's location was lost; the only clue to its location is in old papers in the hands of a Chinese family. Wu Ling agreed to negotiate a sale of the papers and travelled to England to complete the transaction. Mr Pearson was to meet Wu Ling at the train in Southampton but the train was delayed, so Pearson left. He thought Wu Ling made his own way to London where he booked into the Hotel Russell Square and telephoned the company to say that he would see them the next day. He failed to appear at the meeting and the hotel was contacted. They said Wu Ling had gone out earlier with a friend. He still failed to appear at the offices throughout the day. The police were contacted and the next evening Wu Ling's body was found floating in the Thames.

Poirot investigates people who shared the voyage to England with Wu Ling. He finds that one of them, a young bank clerk called Charles Lester, was the man who called for Wu Ling at his hotel on the morning of the disappearance. Mr Lester told a story of having been asked by Wu Ling to call for him at 10:30 am. Instead his servant appeared and asked him to accompany him to meet Wu Ling. Their taxi took them to Limehouse where Lester started to get nervous and got out of the taxi before they reached their destination. That was the end of his connection with the affair.

However, Wu Ling had no servant. The taxi driver who took both men to a known opium den said Lester alone emerged half an hour later. Lester was looking ill. Lester is arrested, but the papers about the mine are not found. Pearson and Poirot go to Limehouse and investigate the opium den. They overhear a conversation between some of the Chinese about the death of Wu Ling and that Lester certainly had the papers. Poirot and Pearson leave the den quietly.

Poirot quickly finds the papers – Pearson has them. He had indeed met Wu Ling in Southampton (there was only his own word that he failed to meet the visitor) and taken him directly to Limehouse, where Wu Ling was killed. One of the opium dealers had already been put into the Hotel Russell Square to impersonate Wu Ling. Hearing of Lester's invitation to visit the hotel from Wu Ling himself, Pearson set the young man up to take the blame for the murder. Lester entered the opium den and was drugged. Having only a hazy recollection and losing his nerve, he denied entering the den. Pearson's insistence in taking Poirot to Limehouse was an elaborate charade to divert the detective's suspicions but it had the opposite effect. Pearson is arrested and Poirot becomes a shareholder in a Burmese mine.

"The Plymouth Express"
A young naval officer on the Plymouth express finds the dead body of a woman underneath a seat in his carriage. The woman is identified as the Honourable Mrs Rupert Carrington, née Flossie Halliday, the daughter of Gordon Halliday, an Australian mining magnate who asks Poirot to take on the case. Prior to her marriage she was caught up with an adventurer called Count de la Rochefour but her father took her to England. She later married Rupert Carrington who proved an unsuitable husband, being a gambler deep in debt. They were about to announce a legal separation. Her will leaves everything to her estranged husband who was away from town at the time of the tragedy.

Poirot and Hastings call on Mr Halliday in Park Lane. Last seen, his daughter was going to a house party in the West Country, carrying her jewels to wear at the house party. The jewels are valued at almost one hundred thousand pounds. She travelled by train from Paddington and changed at Bristol for the train to Plymouth. Her maid travelled with her in a third-class carriage. At Bristol the maid, Jane Mason, received a surprise: Mrs Carrington told her to wait at the station for a few hours. She would return for a later Plymouth train. When she was being given these instructions, Mason could see the back of a tall man in Mrs Carrington's compartment. After waiting at Bristol for most of the day, Mason checked into a hotel for the night and read of the murder in the next day's paper. Mrs Carrington had been chloroformed and then stabbed and the jewels were missing. Mason comes to confirm the facts of her part of the story. She describes what Mrs Carrington was wearing at the time. Poirot pushes Halliday to tell him what he is holding back. Halliday produces a note found in his daughter's pocket from the Count de la Rochefour. It appears that their romance has been restarted.

Inspector Japp makes enquiries into the whereabouts of Rupert Carrington and the Count de la Rochefour at the time of the murder, but nothing substantial comes to light. When Japp next visits, Poirot guesses that the knife used to kill Mrs Carrington has been found by the side of the line between Weston (the first stop after Bristol on the Plymouth line) and Taunton (the next stop) and that a paper boy who spoke to Mrs Carrington has been interviewed. Japp confirms that this is exactly what has happened. Japp tells Poirot something he does not know – that one of the jewels has been pawned by a known thief called Red Narky, a short man who usually works with a woman called Gracie Kidd. Poirot and Hastings return to Halliday's house, to a room on the top floor. Rummaging through Mason's trunk, Poirot finds clothes like the ones worn by Mrs Carrington when she was murdered. Halliday joins them followed by the angry Mason, whom Poirot introduces as Gracie Kidd. She and Red Narky probably murdered Mrs Carrington before Bristol. The story about Mrs Carrington directing her maid to wait at Bristol is false. The knife was thrown off the train before Taunton to support that story. Gracie rode the train past Bristol dressed in similar clothing to the now-dead woman and bought two items from a newsboy, drawing attention to herself in many ways. Gracie Kidd provided herself with an alibi by making the murder by Red Narky appear to have taken place later than it did.

This short story was expanded five years later into the full-length novel The Mystery of the Blue Train, with a very similar plot, but names and details changed.

"The Chocolate Box"
Hastings mentions his belief that Poirot had never known failure in his professional career. Poirot said that was not true and relates the one occasion when he failed to solve a crime, years earlier when he was a police detective in Brussels.

Paul Déroulard, a French Deputy who was living in Brussels, had died from heart failure. At a time of strife over the separation of church and state M. Déroulard was a key player as an anti-Catholic and a potential minister. He lived in a Brussels home that his late wife left him. He had a reputation as a ladies' man. Mademoiselle Virginie Mesnard, a cousin of his late wife, asks Poirot to investigate. She is convinced that his death three days earlier was not natural. M. Déroulard's household consists of four servants, his aged and infirm aristocratic mother, herself, and on that night, two visitors: M. de Saint Alard, a neighbour from France, and John Wilson, an English friend.

Virginie introduces Poirot into the household and he begins interviewing the servants about the meal served on the night of M. Déroulard's death. He suspects poison, but all ate from common serving dishes. In the study where the death occurred, Poirot spots an open but full and untouched box of chocolates. M. Déroulard ate some chocolates every night after dinner, finishing a box on the night of his death. The servant retrieves the empty box. Poirot notices that the lids of the two boxes, one blue and one pink, are switched. As only Déroulard ate the chocolates, the new box should not have been opened yet. His doctor says Saint Alard and Déroulard had argued strenuously that evening, justifying the cause of death. Poirot finds the local chemist who made eye drops for the aged Madame Déroulard, for her cataracts. He finds the "English chemist" who had made up the prescription of trinitrin for John Wilson, small tablets in chocolate to lower blood pressure. Too many tablets at once would prove fatal. This development bothers Poirot. Wilson had the opportunity but not the motive whereas the position is reversed for M. de Saint Alard. Virginie gives Poirot the address of Saint Alard in the Ardennes. In the disguise of a plumber, Poirot breaks into the house and discovers an empty pill bottle from Wilson in the bathroom cupboard. Poirot thinks he has solved the case.

In Brussels, Madame Déroulard summons Poirot. Learning that Poirot was a police officer who had concluded his investigations, she confesses to the murder of her son. Some years before, she saw him push his wife down the stairs and realised that he "was an evil man". Afraid of the persecution that her son's new role would bring upon the church and for his approaches towards the innocent Virginie, she resolved to kill her son. 

She stole John Wilson's tablets. She opened the new box of chocolates before seeing that the previous box was not yet empty. After inserting about 20 tiny tablets in one chocolate, she took the opportunity to place the empty bottle into M. de Saint Alard's pocket when he came to say his farewell, thinking that his valet would throw it away. Poirot told her that he had completed his investigation and the matter was closed.

Madame Déroulard died a week later of her infirmities. Poirot considers his mistakes. The mother's poor eyesight would cause her, and only her, to swap the lids. He misread the psychology of a murderer – Saint Alard would never have kept the empty bottle had he been guilty. Poirot told Hastings to remind him with the phrase chocolate box, if he seemed conceited. Then, he unconsciously goes on to boast about his successes. Hastings hesitates, considers, then graciously refrains from comment.

"The Submarine Plans"
Poirot is urgently summoned late at night by special messenger to 'Sharples', the home of Lord Alloway, head of the Ministry of Defence and a potential future Prime Minister. Arriving with Hastings, he is introduced by their host to Admiral Sir Harry Weardale, the First Sea Lord who is a guest at Sharples together with his wife and son, Leonard. The secret plans for the new 'Z'-type of submarine were stolen some three hours earlier.

The facts of the case are that the ladies of the party – Mrs Conroy and Lady Weardale – retired to bed at 10:00 pm as did Leonard Weardale. Lord Alloway instructed his secretary, Mr Fitzroy, to move the various papers that he and the Admiral would require for their evening's work from the safe out to the table in the study, while the two men walked on the terrace and finished their cigars. Lord Alloway fancies that as they turned back on the terrace he saw a shadow move away from the open French window that leads into the study, although the Admiral is dismissive of this idea. Going into the study, they discovered the submarine plans were missing. Fitzroy claims to have been distracted by a scream outside the study. He went out to find Mrs Conroy's maid standing on the stairs, and she claimed that she had seen a ghost. It was then that the plans were probably stolen.

Poirot examines the grass outside the study window and finds no trace of footprints, even though it rained earlier in the evening. That means someone in the house is responsible. He questions the household, although at Lord Alloway's insistence, he does not reveal to them that the plans have been stolen. Lord Alloway points out that Fitzroy is discounted. His secretary has access to the safe and could have copied the plans at any time. The prime suspect is Mrs Conroy, whose past life is something of a mystery, and she moves in diplomatic circles. She was specifically asked down for the weekend so that they could keep an eye on her. Questioning Conroy's foreign maid, Poirot correctly guesses that she screamed when Leonard Weardale sneaked an unexpected kiss from her. She quickly invented the ghost story when her cry attracted Fitzroy's attention.

At this juncture, Lady Weardale reappears and asks Poirot if the matter could be dropped if the plans were returned. He agrees that that could be arranged and she promises that they will be within ten minutes. Poirot puts this offer to Lord Alloway, without mentioning any names, and leaves. Hastings questions this unexpected turn of events, suspecting Lady Weardale's rumoured bridge debts are real. Poirot points out that as the story of the shadow of an intruder leaving the study turned out to be incorrect, the plans must have been taken by Fitzroy or by Lord Alloway himself – the logical conclusion.

Hastings is dubious but Poirot points out that the man was rumoured to be involved in share scandals years before, although he was later exonerated. Supposing the rumours were true, and he was being blackmailed, in all probability by Mrs Conroy, a foreign agent. He would hand over fake copies of the plans with suitable adjustments to make them useless, and then pretend they had been stolen. That would be why he insisted his loyal secretary was not suspected. Leonard Weardale was busy with the maid at the time of the supposed theft and Lady Weardale could not be the thief as she needed ten minutes to get the plans back, whereas she would need a lot less time if she had taken them and hidden them. Poirot's theory also explains why Lord Alloway did not want the guests told of the theft of the plans – he wanted the foreign power to receive the false plans. Hastings remains unconvinced. However, on the day when Lord Alloway became Prime Minister, Poirot receives a cheque and a signed photograph dedicated to "my discreet friend". He also hears that a foreign power attempted to build their own version of the submarine which ended up a failure.

This short story was later expanded into the novella-length story The Incredible Theft which has a similar plot. There were changes to the character names and story details (e.g., the plans are for a new state-of-the-art bomber rather than for a new submarine).

"The Third Floor Flat"
Four young people, two women and two men, are returning after a night out to the home of one of the women – Patricia Garnett. She is annoyed as she cannot find the key to her flat on the fourth floor of her apartment block in her handbag. The porter does not have a spare key, nor is there a fire escape, but the suggestion is made that the two men, Donovan Bailey and Jimmy Faulkener, make their way up through the coal lift and let the women in.

They go to the basement and make their way up. Exiting the lift, they find the kitchen in darkness and Donovan instructs Jimmy to remain where he is while he locates the light switch. He does so but the light fails to work and Donovan makes his way to the sitting room where he switches on that room's light; they suddenly realise that they have miscounted the floors and that they are in the flat below which, according to a pile of letters, seems to belong to a Mrs Ernestine Grant. They make their way up to the next floor again via the coal lift and let Pat and the second lady, Mildred Hope, into the former's flat. They notice that Donovan has cut himself as there is blood on his hand. He washes it off but cannot find a cut to explain the blood and voices his fears to Jimmy. Again using the coal lift, they return to Mrs Grant's flat below and soon spot a foot sticking out from under a curtain – it is the dead body of Mrs Grant. Back on the landing with the girls, they are discussing calling the police when a voice interrupts them, agreeing with their plan of action. It is the occupant of the fifth floor flat Hercule Poirot, the famous detective. Going into Mrs Grant's flat, Poirot finds it curious that the light switch in the kitchen now works. He also sees that the red tablecloth disguises a patch of blood, which Donovan touched to get the blood on his hand. The body was moved after death.

The police arrive and Poirot and the four people return to Pat's flat. Inspector Rice questions them and tells them that Mrs Grant was shot with an automatic pistol some five hours earlier in the kitchen. They have found a note from someone signed "J.F." saying that he would be there at half-past-seven (the approximate time of death), the pistol with which she was shot and a silk handkerchief used to wipe the prints from the gun. Poirot is suspicious – why would the murderer wipe his prints and yet leave his own handkerchief as evidence behind.

The police leave but the Inspector gives Poirot permission to inspect the flat. He goes down there with Donovan and Jimmy. Poirot searches in the kitchen bin and finds a small bottle. He sniffs the corked top carefully but says that he has a cold; Donovan impetuously pulls the stopper out and sniffs the contents for him. Donovan drops in a faint. Jimmy fetches his friend a drink and Donovan recovers and decides to go home.

Jimmy remains and Poirot tells him the case is solved. There is no such person as John Fraser as the letter and handkerchief were put there to misdirect the police. The bottle in the bin was a ruse by Poirot; it contained ethyl chloride to knock Donovan briefly unconscious. While Jimmy was getting the drink for his friend, Poirot searched Donovan's pockets to find Pat's missing flat key which Donovan had abstracted earlier in the evening and a letter sent to Mrs Grant which arrived by the late evening post. Poirot thought it odd that the light switch in the kitchen did not work then did work minutes later. Donovan needed to get Jimmy out of the kitchen into the other room whilst he found the letter; the light not working was the ruse to gain him the few minutes he needed before the mistake of being in the wrong flat was obvious to Jimmy.

The letter is from a firm of solicitors agreeing that the marriage between Donovan Bailey and Ernestine Grant some eight years before in Switzerland was entirely lawful. Donovan wanted to marry Pat but his previous marriage was stopping him. By chance his first wife moved into the same block as his proposed future wife and was threatening to tell Patricia about their marriage. To stop her, Donovan killed her earlier in the evening but had to return for the solicitor's letter.

"Double Sin"
Poirot, as a result of spreading fame, has been overworked and Hastings suggests he rests by accompanying him on a week's holiday to the south Devon coastal resort of Ebermouth. 

On their fourth day there, Poirot receives a note from the theatrical agent Joseph Aarons who asks him to travel to Charlock Bay on the north Devon coast as he needs to consult him on a matter. The two are planning to go by train but Hastings sees a notice for a motor bus tour from the one resort to the other which will save time on changing trains. Poirot reluctantly agrees, afraid of the uncertain English climate and the drafts of air which will invade the bus. They book their tickets at the office of the company concerned where Hastings is taken with another customer, an auburn-haired girl, whereas Poirot is intrigued by a young man who is attempting to grow a feeble moustache.

The next day on the bus the two find themselves sat with the young girl who introduces herself as Mary Durrant. Her aunt is in Ebermouth and runs an antiques shop where she has managed to make something of a success for herself. Mary has started to work with her aunt as opposed to becoming a governess or a companion and she is travelling to Charlock Bay to take a valuable set of miniatures to an American collector there by the name of J. Baker Wood for perusal and purchase.

The bus stops for lunch at Monkhampton and Miss Durrant joins Poirot and Hastings at a table in a café. Part way through their conversation, she rushes outside and returns saying that she thought she saw through the window a man taking her suitcase with the miniatures off the bus, when she confronted him she realised his case was almost exactly like hers and that she was in error. She does however describe the young man that Poirot and Hastings saw the previous day in the booking office.

The bus arrives in Charlock Bay and both Poirot and Hastings and Miss Durrant book into the Anchor Hotel. They have barely started unpacking when a white-faced Miss Durrant appears and tells them that her suitcase has been unlocked somehow, the despatch case inside containing the miniatures has been forced open and the items stolen. Having heard that Poirot is a detective, she asks him to investigate. Poirot telephones Mr Wood who tells him that he had a visit half-an-hour ago from someone calling on behalf of Elizabeth Penn, Mary Durrant's aunt, and he paid five hundred pounds for the miniatures.

Poirot and Hastings go to visit Mr Wood, Poirot voicing his puzzlement over why the thief took the time to force the lock of despatch case while leaving it in the suitcase instead of taking the inner case away with them and opening it at their leisure. The two meet Mr Wood and take an instant dislike to the brash, vulgar man. He gives them a description of the seller: "a tall woman, middle-aged, grey hair, blotchy complexion and a budding moustache". Poirot finds out that the young man on the bus, Norton Kane, has an alibi for the period in question.

The next day, having sorted out Joseph Aaron's problem, Poirot and Hastings return to Ebermouth but, at Poirot's insistence, this time by train. They call at Elizabeth Penn's shop and Poirot almost immediately accuses the elderly lady of being Mr Wood's visitor of the previous day in disguise and meaningfully tells the two women their scam must cease. Miss Penn, white-faced, agrees.

Poirot then points out to Hastings again the absurdity of the despatch case being forced but left in the suitcase; they never were in Miss Durant's case. When they were booking their tickets on the excursion, he saw Miss Durrant watching Mr Kane and wondered why she was so interested. He expected something to happen on the trip and it did. Mr Wood would have had to return the miniatures as they were officially stolen goods and the two women would have had his five hundred pounds and still possessed the miniatures to sell on again. Their plan was to pass suspicion on to Mr Kane and have Poirot and Hastings as two duped witnesses.

"The Market Basing Mystery"
At Japp’s suggestion Poirot and Hastings joined him for the weekend in the small countryside town of Market Basing. Enjoying Sunday breakfast, the three are interrupted when the local constable requested Japp's help. Walter Protheroe, the reclusive owner of a local large mansion, was found dead in his dilapidated house, supposedly by suicide. 

The three go to Leigh House as requested and meet Dr Giles who was called in by Miss Clegg, the housekeeper. She was unable to raise her master, Walter Protheroe, in his bedroom, nor could Giles. Constable Pollard arrived at that moment and he and the doctor broke down the oak door. Inside they found Protheroe, shot through the head and his pistol clasped in his right hand. The problem was that the bullet entered behind the left ear and such a shot was impossible.

As they examine the room Hastings puzzled as to why Poirot sniffed the air so keenly and also why he examined so carefully a handkerchief lodged up Protheroe's right sleeve. Hastings could smell nothing in the air, nor could he see anything on the handkerchief. The key is missing from the lock of the door and Japp supposes that this was the murderer's error in trying to make the murder look like suicide. A couple named Parker were staying in the house. Miss Clegg says their unexpected first visit did not seem to please Protheroe. He kept a pistol, although she has not seen it for some time. She cannot say why the windows of the room were locked and bolted contrary to custom. Mr Parker lies about owning a cufflink found at the crime scene. At the inquest a tramp comes forward to say that he heard Protheroe and Parker argue about money at midnight on the night of the death. Protheroe's true surname was Wendover; he had been involved with the treacherous sinking of a naval vessel some years earlier and Parker was blackmailing him over this. On the suspicion of killing Wendover and making it look like suicide, Parker is arrested.

Poirot summons Miss Clegg to the inn. He surmises that Wendover did in fact kill himself, with his left hand holding the gun. Clegg admits that when she found him in the morning, she judged Parker to be the cause, so she changed the pistol to his right hand to throw suspicion on the blackmailer to bring him to justice; however, she neglected to change the handkerchief up the right sleeve over to the left sleeve as well. She locked and bolted the windows to prevent it looking like a potential murderer escaped by that method, therefore indicating that the murderer was someone in the house. The fireplace grate was full of smoked cigarettes, yet the air was fresh. Poirot deduced that the windows of the room must have been open that night, otherwise the air would have smelled smoky and the tramp could not have overheard the conversation he did.

"Wasps' Nest"
Sitting on the garden terrace of his large house on a summer evening, John Harrison is delighted to receive an unexpected visit from Hercule Poirot. The detective tells him that he is in the locality to investigate a murder but amazes Harrison by admitting that the murder has not yet been committed but that it is better to prevent one happening first. He then cryptically turns the conversation round to a wasps' nest on a tree that he sees nearby and Poirot and Harrison discuss the destruction of it. A friend of Harrison, Claude Langton, is going to handle the task for him using petrol injected by a garden syringe but Poirot tells him that earlier that day he saw the poison book in a local chemist's and an earlier entry made by Langton for the purchase of cyanide, despite Langton having told Harrison that such substances should not ever be available for pest control. Poirot asks a quiet question: "Do you like Langton?" and they talk of Harrison's engagement to a girl called Molly Deane who was previously engaged to Langton. As they discuss Langton's disposition towards Harrison, Poirot's meaning becomes quite clear to the other man – he is being warned. Poirot asks when Langton is returning and is told nine o'clock that evening. Poirot tells him that he will return at that time, wondering as he goes if he should have waited behind.

Poirot returns just before the appointed time to find Langton leaving, the nest still intact. Harrison seems to be fine and Poirot hopes that he is not feeling any ill-effects of having digested the harmless washing soda that he consumed. Harrison is surprised. Poirot tells him that he traded the cyanide Harrison had in his pocket for the soda when he visited earlier on. Poirot met Langton after leaving the chemist's and heard from him that Harrison had insisted on the use of cyanide over petrol. Poirot witnessed the early signs of Langton's romance with Molly Deane being rekindled and Harrison leaving a Harley Street consultant having obviously been given bad news. Harrison confirms that he has two months to live. Having seen signs of Harrison's hatred for Langton, Poirot surmised that Harrison was planning to commit suicide and make it appear that Langton had killed him, ensuring that his rival would be hanged for murder. Poirot's earlier conversation included several traps, including the time of Langton's appointment. Poirot already knew Langton was due to return at eight-thirty but Harrison said it was nine, by which time he hoped to have committed the deed. Having realised and repented of what he would have done, Harrison expresses his gratitude for Poirot having visited and spoiled his plans.

"The Veiled Lady"
Poirot tells Hastings that the criminals of England fear him too much, so he has no cases. Hastings describes a recent theft from a jeweller's shop window in Bond Street. The perpetrator was arrested on the spot. However, they found paste copies of the six stolen stones on him. He had already passed the real jewels to an accomplice.

A heavily veiled lady arrives. She identifies herself as Lady Millicent Castle Vaughan, whose engagement to the Duke of Southshire was recently announced. At age sixteen she wrote an indiscreet letter to a soldier. The letter would surely anger her fiancé, and it is now in the possession of Mr Lavington. He is demanding twenty thousand pounds for its return, a sum she cannot afford. She went to Lavington's house in  Wimbledon to plead with him. He showed her the letter in a Chinese puzzle box and says he keeps in a place she will never find. Lavington calls on Poirot, but laughs at his request to return the letter. He leaves for Paris, giving Lady Millicent several days to pay up.

Poirot goes to Lavington's house the next day. He calls in the morning, dressed as a man hired to affix burglarproof locks on the window. He saws through the sash latch of a window and breaks in that night with Hastings. After a long search, Poirot finds the box hidden in a hollowed log, at the bottom of a small wood pile in the kitchen.

The next day, Lady Millicent calls for the letter. She also insists on the puzzle box as a souvenir but Poirot prevents her taking it. Then, he reveals a hidden compartment in the box holding the six missing jewels from the Bond Street robbery. The fake letter was a red herring for anyone who found the puzzle box. Japp appears from another room and identifies the lady as "Gertie", an accomplice of Lavington, whose real name was Reed. Reed was killed in Holland a few days before for his double-cross of his gang over the jewels. The gang members decided to use Poirot to retrieve the missing jewels. Poirot tells Hastings that it was the cheap shoes she was wearing that gave her away. A true well-born woman would never be so poorly shod. Poirot concludes that not only is he known to the criminals of England, they try to use him when their own efforts fail.

"Problem at Sea"
Poirot is undergoing the trial of a sea voyage to Egypt, supposedly as a holiday. Not enjoying one bit the motion of the waves, he joins in the conversations of the other passengers. Among them is a General Forbes who is angrily dismissive of a man who calls himself Colonel Clapperton. He states that Clapperton is a former music hall performer who, injured during the war, got himself into a society lady's nursing home and then received her patronage to find him a job at the War Office. 

The other passengers on the boat are more sympathetic towards Clapperton, particularly as he demonstrates continuing patience with his shrewish and hypochondriac wife, who complains of her heart trouble while at the same time stating that she keeps extremely active, despite her husband's constant entreaties to take life easier. Even Poirot seems to incur her wrath when he responds a little too dryly to her conversation. Somewhat annoyed with him, she marches out of the smoking room where they have been conversing, dropping the contents of her handbag on the way. She leaves behind a piece of paper – a prescription for digitalin.

Two young girls on the boat, Kitty Mooney and Pamela Creegan, take a shine to the Colonel and decide to "rescue" him from his wife. They take him for a walk on the boat deck while his wife plays bridge, a game which the Colonel will not play. Later on, Poirot sees the Colonel demonstrating amazing card tricks to the two young girls who have taken him under their wing. Able to deal out hands of exact suits to the others, the Colonel makes them realise why he will not play cards – he would be able to cheat and win every time – or at least be suspected of doing so – and it would be better for him not to take part.

The boat reaches Alexandria and many of the company go ashore. Mrs Clapperton refuses, shouting to her husband from behind her locked cabin door that she has suffered a bad night and wants to be left alone. When everyone has returned later on, Mrs Clapperton is still not answering her door. A steward opens it for her worried husband and they find the lady dead – stabbed through the heart with a native dagger and money and jewellery stolen. Several bead sellers were allowed on the boat at the port and they are questioned, particularly as one of their wares was found on the floor of the cabin. Poirot though is puzzled: the door to the cabin was locked from within and he cannot see a reason why Mrs Clapperton would open it to a bead seller, nor why such a person would murder her and lay himself so open to suspicion.

That evening, at Poirot's request, the other passengers are assembled in the lounge. Poirot addresses them and unwraps a ventriloquist's doll which speaks and repeats the words used by Mrs Clapperton from behind the locked cabin door to her husband. Colonel Clapperton jumps up and promptly collapses, dead of a heart attack.

Poirot explains: Mrs Clapperton was already dead when her husband, witnessed by Poirot, Kitty and Pamela, heard her "speak" to him from inside the cabin but it was her husband using his music hall act. He showed his card trick to the others to divert attention away from his real skill. Poirot's use of the doll in the lounge was helped by a young girl (a fellow passenger and the owner of the doll) behind a curtain providing the voice. Poirot is not surprised that Clapperton died of a weak heart – digitalin would have produced symptoms of dilated pupils which he did not see in Mrs Clapperton but he did see in her husband; the prescription was for him.

"How Does Your Garden Grow?"
Poirot receives a strange letter for assistance from an elderly woman, Miss Amelia Barrowby, who lives at Rosebank in Charman's Green. She is extremely vague in defining the problem, but adds several times that discretion is paramount as family is involved. The letter intrigues Poirot who has his secretary Miss Felicity Lemon draft a reply saying that he is at the lady's service.

Five days later Miss Lemon spots an announcement in the "personal column" of The Morning Post about the death of Miss Barrowby. Poirot sends a letter to Rosebank to provoke a response from the next of kin, and he duly receives a reply from Mary Delafontaine, the dead woman's niece, saying that his services are no longer required. Nevertheless, he goes to the house and admires the well-maintained garden with its spring flowers and edging of shells. Let into the house by a maid, the first person he meets is a young Russian girl called Katrina Reiger, who speaks cryptically of the money that by rights is hers. She is interrupted by Mrs Delafontaine and her husband who dismiss Katrina and meet Poirot. They seem shocked to find that he is a detective.

Poirot interviews the local police inspector who tells him that they now know that Miss Barrowby died from a dose of strychnine but the problem is that the victim and her two family members all ate the same meal. The Delafontaines are suspected as they will inherit a large sum of money, which they very much need, but it was Katrina who gave her employer her medicinal powders and it is possible the strychnine was in those. However, Katrina does not appear to benefit from Miss Barrowby's death, and would, in fact, have been out of a job. The next day, brings the news that most of the estate has been left to Katrina, thereby providing a motive, and she is detained by the police. A packet of strychnine powders is found under Katrina's mattress which seems to clinch the matter. Poirot though is not convinced and arranges matters in a methodical order in his own mind. It is then he remembers the garden. He sends out Miss Lemon to make particular enquiries and then interviews Katrina who confirms that she ate separately from the family, as she always did, but had the same food as them.

Poirot, after consulting with Miss Lemon, calls at Rosebank and sees Mrs Delafontaine. At the front door, he points to the unfinished row of shells – the only unsymmetrical item in that well-maintained and symmetrical garden – and points out they are oyster shells. Miss Lemon found the fishmonger who sold the oysters to the Delafontaines. They fed Miss Barrowby poisoned oysters and planted the shells in the garden to hide from Katrina and the maid. Mrs Delafontaine confesses that she and her husband had been pilfering money from her aunt for many years and could not let the estate go to Katrina.

Literary significance and reception
Maurice Richardson in The Observer (22 September 1974) described Hastings as, "so dumb at times he makes Watson look like Leibnitz", and concluded, "Many date from an early period before she found herself as a Mystifier, but all communicate that unique Christie euphoria."

Robert Barnard: "A late collection of early stories (most from the 'twenties), which had been published in the States but not in Britain. This may suggest discarded chips from the workshop, but in fact the standard here is distinctly higher than the stories in Poirot Investigates, which were the ones Christie did publish at the time."

References or allusions

References to other works
 The Submarine Plans mentions the events recounted in the 1923 short story The Kidnapped Prime Minister and also references the fictional prime minister of that story, David McAdam.
 Double Sin references the theatrical agent Joseph Aarons who had previously appeared in The Murder on the Links (1923).
 In The Market Basing Mystery, Hastings slightly misquotes the anonymous piece of doggerel verse which in full reads:

 The rabbit has a charming face:
 Its private life is a disgrace.
 I really dare not name to you
 The awful things that rabbits do;
 Things that your paper never prints –
 You only mention them in hints.
 They have such lost, degraded souls
 No wonder they inhabit holes;
 When such depravity is found
 It only can live underground.

References to actual history, geography and current science
 The events depicted in The Chocolate Box occurred in 1893, when the debate over the separation of church and state in France was a hot issue. In The Chocolate Box story the exact date is not mentioned, but in the novel Peril at End House, chapter 15, Poirot says that the events took place in 1893. The events of the separation of church and state were wholly confined to the French state; the murdered man was in the French government but lived in an inherited house in Brussels. In the TV adaptation the Paul Déroulard murder takes place just prior to the outbreak of World War I in 1914.
 In Double Sin, Mary Durrant speaks of the miniatures she is transporting as being by Cosway. This is a reference to Richard Cosway (1742–1821), one of the most successful practitioners of that art of the Georgian era.

References in other works
 The Double Clue, first published in 1923, features the first of three appearances of the character of Countess Vera Rossakoff. Her other two appearances were in the series of stories in The Sketch magazine in early 1924 that eventually made up the contents of The Big Four (1927) and in The Capture of Cerberus, the final story of The Labours of Hercules (1947). Poirot's admiration of the lady mirrors that of Conan Doyle's Sherlock Holmes for Irene Adler as described in A Scandal in Bohemia (1891).
 The Double Clue also features the use of the Cyrillic alphabet as a deception, a trick that Christie reused in Murder on the Orient Express (1934).
 The plot set-up contained in The Market Basing Mystery of a suicide being made to look like murder to trap a blackmailer was expanded by Christie into the novella-length story Murder in the Mews published in the collection of the same name in 1937.  It also bears resemblance to Conan Doyle's The Problem of Thor Bridge, solved by Sherlock Holmes.
 The plot set-up contained in How Does Your Garden Grow? of a vague letter for assistance from a woman who soon dies was expanded by Christie into the full-length 1937 novel Dumb Witness.
 The Chocolate Box case is mentioned in the novel Peril at End House (1932) in chapter 15, when Poirot tells Commander Challenger that he indeed had failures in the past.
 The Submarine Plans published in 1923 has the same plot as "The Incredible Theft" published in 1937
 The protagonist in Margaret Atwood's "Giving Birth" reads Poirot's Early Cases while in labour.

Film, television or theatrical adaptations

Early television play
Wasp's Nest was the very first Agatha Christie story to be adapted for television with a live transmission taking place on 18 June 1937. Agatha Christie adapted it, and transmission was restricted to a small area in and around London.

British television series
All the stories in the collection have been adapted for episodes in the ITV series Agatha Christie's Poirot with David Suchet in the role of Poirot, Hugh Fraser as Hastings, Philip Jackson as Japp and Pauline Moran as Miss Lemon. Fifteen stories were directly adapted, while one story was merged into another episode, and two stories were reworked by the author, with new titles, which were then adapted for television in the series.

Fifteen adaptations (in order of transmission) were:

Series One
The Adventure of the Clapham Cook: 8 January 1989
Chief Inspector Japp and Miss Lemon are put into the story although they do not appear in the short story.
The Adventure of Johnnie Waverly: 22 January 1989
The adaptation has a few changes. Miss Lemon is put into the story though she does not appear in the short story. Inspector McNeil is replaced with recurring character Chief Inspector Japp. Mr Waverly asks Poirot for help, not his wife. When Poirot solves the case, Mr Waverly tells him that Johnnie is with Jessie Withers, Tredwell's niece, not his old nurse. Mr Waverly, Poirot and Hastings go to Jessie's house.
The Third Floor Flat: 5 February 1989
The adaptation is faithful to the original short story, except for the addition of Captain Hastings and Miss Lemon and replacing Inspector Rice with Chief Inspector Japp. Donovan Bailey tries to escape during Poirot's denouement and crashes Hastings's car during the attempted runaway when Hastings jumps in front of the car.
Problem at Sea: 19 February 1989
The adaptation is faithful to the original story except for adding Captain Hastings to the story and replacing the stewardess in Poirot's denouement with the little girl Ismene.
The King of Clubs: 5 March 1989
The adaptation adds Chief Inspector Japp to the story. Poirot and Hastings are on the movie set and there Prince Paul asks Poirot for help, unlike in the short story where he asks the question in Poirot's flat. Valerie Saint Clair is an actress, unlike in the short story, where she is a dancer.

Series Two
The Veiled Lady: 14 January 1990
The adaptation adds Miss Lemon to the story. Poirot is arrested as an attempted burglar and Hastings manages to escape; later he informs Japp about the incident, who afterwards lets Poirot go. Gertie has an accomplice who pretended to be Lavington and Lavington's real name is Lavington indeed, not Reed as it was in the short story.
The Lost Mine: 21 January 1990
The adaptation adds Miss Lemon to the story and replaces Inspector Miller with Chief Inspector Japp. Charles Lester has a wife who visits Poirot, unlike in the short story where the fact about his status is left unknown. Pearson's plan is little changed from the story. In the adaptation he never saw Wu Ling, but in the story he saw him, but acted as if he didn't. Also, Poirot calls Pearson into the den, unlike in the short story where it was Pearson who called Poirot.
The Cornish Mystery: 28 January 1990
Chief Inspector Japp and Miss Lemon are put into the story. Mrs. Pengelley wants Poirot to help her but is afraid to go to his flat. In the adaptation, Hastings uses the two men on the street to look like they are police officers in disguise to scare Radnor, unlike in the short story where it is Poirot who does so.
Double Sin: 11 February 1990
Chief Inspector Japp and Miss Lemon are put into the story. Joseph Aarons does not appear in the adaptation as Poirot and Hastings go to Windermere on a holiday after Poirot announces that he is going to retire (all to hide the fact that he is actually going there to hear Japp's presentation about the crime cases). Norton Kane becomes a famous writer.

Series Three
How Does Your Garden Grow?: 6 January 1991
The adaptation has a few changes. Captain Hastings is put into the story. Inspector Simms has been replaced by Chief Inspector Japp. Poirot meets Miss Barroby at an event about the new rose. In the original short story, he got Miss Barroby's letter long after her death and then went to her house to investigate.
The Affair at the Victory Ball: 20 January 1991
Miss Lemon is put into the story. Poirot is at the Victory Ball with Hastings and Japp, unlike in the original short story, where he heard about the case from Chief Inspector Japp, as he wasn't at the Victory Ball himself.
Wasp's Nest: 27 January 1991
Captain Hastings, Chief Inspector Japp and Miss Lemon are put into the story. The basic premise of the story is left unchanged but the original story comprised mainly a bare-bones narrative by Poirot and included him recalling events from some time ago. This would have been almost impossible to dramatize as is. In the episode, events are presented sequentially with many added plot elements and scenes.
The Double Clue: 10 February 1991
Chief Inspector Japp and Miss Lemon are put into the story. Countess Rossakoff does not go to Poirot's flat; instead, Poirot is with her all the time while Hastings and Miss Lemon investigate the case an their own. Poirot employs a private detective to act like a tramp near Hardman's house to throw Hastings and Miss Lemon after the wrong clue. During Poirot's denouement, Japp finds the missing jewels. Afterwards, Poirot is at the train station where he sees the countess off.
The Plymouth Express: 3 March 1991
Miss Lemon is put into the story.  Gracie Kidd wasn't in the train on the time murder happened. Red Narky's name is changed to the surname MacKenzie.

Series Five
The Chocolate Box: 21 February 1993 (Note: Some scenes were filmed in Brussels, Belgium.)
There are small differences in the television adaptation of The Chocolate Box from the short story. Captain Hastings is not involved. Poirot and Chief Inspector Japp visit Belgium for Japp to receive the prestigious Branche d'Or (Golden Branch) Award. The case is told in flashback and Poirot admits his error in a circular fashion. The chemist is Belgian, Jean-Louis Ferraud. Virginie Mesnard marries him and has two sons. During the investigation, Poirot and Virginie became close. At the end of the episode, Poirot and Virginie meet again and he tells her that Jean-Louis is most fortunate. The flashback year is changed from 1893 to 1914.

Two of the stories in this collection were reworked by Agatha Christie with new titles, and adapted for television under the new titles, both in series one of Agatha Christie's Poirot. Submarine Plans was extended into The Incredible Theft, which aired 26 February 1989 as the eighth episode of series one. The Market Basing Mystery was reworked as Murder in the Mews, which first aired 15 January 1989 as the second episode in series one. Elements of the remaining story, The Lemesurier Inheritance, were worked into the plot of The Labours of Hercules, which first aired 6 November 2013 in the UK.

French television series
The story The Adventure of Johnnie Waverly was adapted as the twelfth episode of season 2 of the French television series Les Petits Meurtres d'Agatha Christie, airing in 2016.

Japanese animated television series
Two of the stories (Plymouth Express and The Adventure of the Clapham Cook) were adapted as 2005 episodes of the Japanese animated television series Agatha Christie's Great Detectives Poirot and Marple.

Publication history
 1974, Collins Crime Club (London), September 1974, Hardcover, 256 pp; 
 1974, Dodd Mead and Company (New York), 1974, Hardcover, 250 pp; 
 1975, G.K. Hall & Company Large-print edition, Hardcover, 491 pp; 
 1978, Fontana Books (Imprint of HarperCollins), Paperback, 224 pp; 
 1990, Ulverscroft large-print edition, Hardback;

First publication of stories
All but five of the stories were first published in the UK, unillustrated, in The Sketch magazine. Christie wrote them following a suggestion from its editor, Bruce Ingram, who had been impressed with the character of Poirot in The Mysterious Affair at Styles. The stories first appeared in The Sketch as follows:

The Affair at the Victory Ball: 7 March 1923 – Issue 1571 (This was Christie's first published short story).
The King of Clubs: 21 March 1923 – Issue 1573 (under the title The Adventure of the King of Clubs).
The Plymouth Express: 4 April 1923 – Issue 1575 (under the title The Mystery of the Plymouth Express). The plot was later reworked as the novel The Mystery of the Blue Train (1928).
The Chocolate Box: 23 May 1923 – Issue 1582 (under the title The Clue of the Chocolate Box).
The Veiled Lady: 3 October 1923 – Issue 1601 (under the title The Case of the Veiled Lady).
The Adventure of Johnnie Waverly: 10 October 1923 – Issue 1602 (under the title The Kidnapping of Johnny Waverly).
The Market Basing Mystery: 17 October 1923 – Issue 1603.
The Submarine Plans: 7 November 1923 – Issue 1606.
The Adventure of the Clapham Cook: 14 November 1923 – Issue 1607.
The Lost Mine: 21 November 1923 – Issue 1608.
The Cornish Mystery: 28 November 1923 – Issue 1609.
The Double Clue: 5 December 1923 – Issue 1610.
The Lemesurier Inheritance: 18 December 1923 – Issue 1612.
The remaining stories were published as follows:
 Double Sin: First published in the 23 September 1928 edition of the Sunday Dispatch.
 Wasp's Nest: First published in the 20 November 1928 edition of the Daily Mail.
 The Third Floor Flat: First published in the January 1929 issue of Hutchinson's Adventure & Mystery Story Magazine.
 How Does Your Garden Grow?: First published in issue 536 of The Strand magazine in August 1935. The story was illustrated by R. M. Chandler.
 Problem at Sea: First published in issue 542 of The Strand magazine in February 1936 (under the title of Poirot and the Crime in Cabin 66).

The Submarine Plans had previously been expanded and published as The Incredible Theft in the 1937 collection, Murder in the Mews. The 1974 version reverts to the original 1923 text.

The Market Basing Mystery had previously appeared in book form in the UK in the 1966 collection Thirteen for Luck!, which otherwise reprinted stories which had previously appeared in book collections.

US book appearances of stories
Although Poirot's Early Cases was published in the US, all of the stories had previously appeared in the following US collections:
Poirot Investigates (1924) – The Chocolate Box, The Veiled Lady, The Lost Mine (US version only).
The Regatta Mystery and Other Stories (1939) – Problem at Sea, How Does Your Garden Grow?
Three Blind Mice and Other Stories (1950) – The Adventure of Johnnie Waverly, The Third Floor Flat.
The Under Dog and Other Stories (1951) – The Affair at the Victory Ball, The King of Clubs, The Plymouth Express, The Market Basing Mystery, The Submarine Plans, The Adventure of the Clapham Cook, The Cornish Mystery, The Lemesurier Inheritance.
Double Sin and Other Stories (1961) – The Double Clue, Double Sin, Wasp's Nest.

References

External links
Poirot's Early Cases at the official Agatha Christie website
 Poirot's Early Cases at the Home of Agatha Christie website

Hercule Poirot short story collections
1974 short story collections
Collins Crime Club books